José Alexis Márquez Restrepo (born 30 June 1981) is a Colombian football manager and former player who played as a goalkeeper.

Playing career
Born in Pereira, Márquez started his career with Ferro Club before making his professional debut with Deportivo Pereira in 1999. He left the club in 2007 for Real Cartagena, but returned to Pereira in the following year.

In 2012, after a short period at Deportivo Pasto, Márquez retired and became Deportivo Pereira's goalkeeping coach. In 2014, however, he returned to action with Pereira, definitely retiring in 2015. He ended his career with 292 matches in his 14-year spell for Pereira, being the second-highest appearance holder in the club, only behind Luis Pompilio Páez.

Managerial career
After retiring, Márquez was again named goalkeeping coach for Deportivo Pereira. In November 2020, he was named interim manager after the departure of Néstor Craviotto.

On 26 February 2021, after Jorge Artigas left on a mutual agreement, Márquez was again appointed interim of Pereira. On 22 April, he was permanently appointed manager.

On 14 May 2022, Márquez resigned from Pereira. On 13 September, he was appointed manager of Jaguares de Córdoba, replacing Grigori Méndez. After failing to advance to the semifinal stage of the 2022 Finalización tournament, and citing personal matters, Márquez resigned from Jaguares on 1 November.

References

External links

1976 births
Living people
People from Pereira, Colombia
Colombian footballers
Association football goalkeepers
Deportivo Pereira footballers
Real Cartagena footballers
Deportivo Pasto footballers
Colombian football managers
Categoría Primera A managers
Deportivo Pereira managers
Jaguares de Córdoba managers